Paranja  or paranji (from فرنجية паранджа) is a traditional Central Asian robe for women and girls that covers the head and body. It is also known as "burqa" in Arabic. It is similar in basic style and function to other regional styles such as the Afghan chadari. The traditional veil in Central Asia worn before modern times was the faranji. The part that covered the face, known as the chachvan (or chachvon), was heavy in weight and made from horsehair. It was especially prevalent among urban Uzbeks and Tajiks. The paranja was worn in Khorezm. It was also worn during the Shaybanids' rule (1510–1600).

In the 1800s, women of the Tajiks and Uzbek Muslims were required to wear paranja when outside the home. Paranji and chachvon were by 1917 common among urban Uzbek women of the southern river basins. This was less frequently worn in the rural areas, and scarcely at all on the nomadic steppe.

One historical account of the paranja is from Lord Curzon, who travelled to Bukhara in 1886. During his time there he never saw a woman between the ages of 10 and 50, for they were all concealed. The heavy black horsehair veils were "too bad and coarse for a seive", the women walking in loosely wrapped blue gowns with the empty sleeves pinned could have been "mistaken for clothes wandering about", and big leather boots covered their feet. Curzon noted that "Ladies of rank and good character never venture to show themselves in any public place or bazaar." He condemned this as a kind of tyranny, an exaggerated and erroneous notion of morality found everywhere in the East, but nowhere so striking as in Bukhara.

Russia's October Revolution, which brought about state atheism, sought to discourage or ban the veil and the paranja.
The unveiling by the Soviets was called the hujum in the Uzbek Soviet Socialist Republic (SSR). As the Soviet Communists secured their control of Central Asia, chachvans and paranjas were banned.
The paranjas were burned on orders of the Communists, who upheld the doctrine of Marxist-Leninist atheism. In the 1920s, the government "brought gangs of militant young atheists to Central Asia who physically assaulted women, often tearing the veil from their faces in the streets of Tashkent, Samarkand, and other cities."
However, some veil-wearing Muslim women responded by killing the women who were sent to take their veils off. Some Uzbeks violently opposed the anti-paranja, anti-child marriage and anti-polygamy campaign which was started by the Soviet Union.

Since the dissolution of the Soviet Union, Tajikistan President Emomali has claimed that veils were not part of Tajik culture. The veil was attacked by the government of Kyrgyz President Almazbek Atambayev. They are seldom worn now in Central Asia.

See also

 Niqāb and burqa (Muslim women's garments) related regulations
 Types of hijab
 Hujum

References

Further reading

External links
For analysis of and discussion of the function of the robes, and for photos of such robes, see:
Worldisround.com
Powerhousemuseum.com
http://www.all-about-photo.com/photographer.php?name=arkady-shaikhet&id=517&popupimage=8#top
http://weheartit.com/entry/group/38110430
http://www.susanmeller.com/books/silk-and-cotton/
http://shop.hotmooncollection.com/uzbek-horsehair-face-veil/ https://www.pinterest.com/pin/101542166574656568
http://www.talesoftheveils.info/dave_potter/new_uzbeki_woman.html

Islamic female clothing
Robes and cloaks
Uzbekistani culture
Veils